The 1935–36 Segunda División season saw 24 teams participate in the second flight Spanish league. Celta and Zaragoza were promoted to Primera División, after both clubs won 5–0, and Arenas lost 0–1, in the final round of the promotion playoff. Nacional, Unión Sportiva Vigo, Júpiter, Real Unión, Mirandilla and Elche were relegated to Regional.

Group I

Teams

League table

Results

Group II

Teams

League Table

Results

Group III

Teams

League Table

Results

Promotion playoff

Results

References

External links
LFP website

Segunda División seasons
2
Spain